Fellside Wood is a woodland in Cumbria, England, near the village of Old Hutton. It is owned and managed by the Woodland Trust.

References

Forests and woodlands of Cumbria